Osteocephalus yasuni is a species of frogs in the family Hylidae. The specific name yasuni refers to the Yasuni National Park where its type locality is.

Description
Males measure  and females  in snout–vent length. The dorsum is brown with dark brown spots. The ventral coloration varies, from bright yellow to yellowish cream in adult males and cream in adult females. Males have rough skin while females have smooth skin. It has expanded discs on the fingers.

Habitat and conservation
The species' natural habitats are tropical primary moist forests, in both terra firme and seasonally flooded forests. It breeds in temporary pools. It is nocturnal, although during some months males can be heard calling during the daytime.

It is locally affected by habitat loss, but there are no major threats to this reasonably abundant and widespread species. It occurs in a number of protected areas, including its namesake Yasuni National Park.

References

Osteocephalus
Amphibians of Colombia
Amphibians of Ecuador
Amphibians of Peru
Amphibians described in 1999
Taxonomy articles created by Polbot